Ivan Lendl defeated Mikael Pernfors in the final, 6–3, 6–2, 6–4 to win the men's singles tennis title at the 1986 French Open.

Mats Wilander was the defending champion, but lost in the third round to Andrei Chesnokov.

Seeds
The seeded players are listed below. Ivan Lendl is the champion; others show the round in which they were eliminated.

  Ivan Lendl (champion)
  Mats Wilander (third round)
  Boris Becker (quarterfinals)
  Yannick Noah (fourth round)
  Stefan Edberg (second round)
  Joakim Nyström (first round)
  Anders Järryd (third round)
  Henri Leconte (semifinals)
  Andrés Gómez (quarterfinals)
  Thierry Tulasne (second round)
  Martín Jaite (fourth round)
  Guillermo Vilas (quarterfinals)
  Johan Kriek (semifinals)
  Emilio Sánchez (fourth round)
 n/a
  Heinz Günthardt (first round)

Draw

Key
 Q = Qualifier
 WC = Wild card
 LL = Lucky loser
 r = Retired

Finals

Section 1

Section 2

Section 3

Section 4

Section 5

Section 6

Section 7

Section 8

External links
 Association of Tennis Professionals (ATP) – 1986 French Open Men's Singles draw
1986 French Open – Men's draws and results at the International Tennis Federation

Men's Singles
French Open by year – Men's singles
1986 Grand Prix (tennis)